TV Simić or  is a local commercial television channel based in Banja Luka, Bosnia and Herzegovina. The program is mainly produced in Serbian. TV station was established in 1996. TV Simić reports on local events in Banja Luka, Republika Srpska entity and BiH.

References

External links 
 www.tvsimic.com
 Communications Regulatory Agency of Bosnia and Herzegovina

Mass media in Banja Luka
Television stations in Bosnia and Herzegovina
Television channels and stations established in 1996